The 2020–21 Cyprus Basketball Division A is the 54th season of the Cyprus Basketball Division A, the top-tier level men's professional basketball league on Cyprus.

Teams and locations

Regular season

Championship Group

Relegation Group

Cypriot clubs in European competitions

References

External links
Cyprus Basketball Federation
Cyprus at Eurobasket.com

Cyprus
Basketball
Basketball
Cyprus Basketball Division 1